Juan Eudes Afara Maciel (born August 19, 1960) is a Paraguayan politician who was elected as Vice President in 2013 elections. He is a member of the Colorado Party and took office on 15 August. In April 2018 Afara left the Vice Presidency to run as a Senator; later that month, Afara was elected as a Senator representing the Colorado Party in the 2018 elections and will take office on 1 July 2018.

Awards and honors
Order of Brilliant Star with Special Grand Cordon – Republic of China

References

1960 births
Living people
People from Misiones Department
Colorado Party (Paraguay) politicians
Vice presidents of Paraguay